World of Black and Silver is Crystal Eyes' first album released in 1999 by Crazy Life Music. Released again in 2005 under Crystal Eyes' new label, Heavy Fidelity.

Track listing
"Interstellar War" - 4:59 
"Gods of the World" - 3:55
"Winds of the Free" - 4:49
"The Power Behind the Throne" - 6:18
"The Dragon's Lair" - 4:59
"Eyes of the Forest Gloom" - 7:11
"Rage on the Sea" - 7:01
"Victims of the Frozen Hate" - 5:30
"Extreme Paranoia" - 3:31
"Glory Ride" - 5:06
"World of Black and Silver" - 5:24

Credits
 Mikael Dahl - Vocals and Guitar
 Jonathan Nyberg - Guitar
 Claes Wikander - Bass Guitar
 Kujtim Gashi - Drums

Production, recording, mixing, and mastering by Crystal Eyes and Detlef Mohrmann.

1999 albums
Crystal Eyes albums